Yves Hocdé (born 29 April 1973 in Nantes) is a French competition rower, world champion and Olympic champion.

Hocdé won a gold medal in the lightweight coxless four event at the 2000 Summer Olympics. He was world champion in this event in 2001.

References

1973 births
French male rowers
Olympic rowers of France
Rowers at the 2000 Summer Olympics
Olympic gold medalists for France
Sportspeople from Nantes
Living people
Olympic medalists in rowing
Medalists at the 2000 Summer Olympics
World Rowing Championships medalists for France
21st-century French people